The People Garden is a 2016 Canadian-Japanese drama film written and directed by Nadia Litz and starring Dree Hemingway, Pamela Anderson,  Jai West and François Arnaud. The film premiered at the 2016 Buenos Aires International Independent Film Festival.

Plot
Sweetpea (Dree Hemingway) travels to Japan in order to break up with her rocker boyfriend (François Arnaud). While there, she discovers that her boyfriend has disappeared while shooting a music video in the Aokigahara forest, a place popularly used as a suicide site, and she begins to suspect he has died.

Cast
 Dree Hemingway as Sweetpea
 Pamela Anderson as Signe
 Jai West as Mak
 François Arnaud as Jamie

Development
Litz began writing the movie in 2011.

References

External links

The People Garden at Library and Archives Canada

Films shot in Greater Sudbury
Films shot in Japan
Canadian drama films
2016 drama films
2010s English-language films
2010s Canadian films